Dr. Mohd Nasir bin Hashim (Jawi: محمد ناصر بن هشيم; born 1947) is a Malaysian democratic socialist politician and former president of the Socialist Party of Malaysia (PSM). He was also the State Assemblyman for Kota Damansara in Selangor from 2008 to 2013. He is a former Chairman of INSAN and Social Research Institute.

Education
Mohd Nasir completed his secondary education at Royal Military College. He obtained Bachelor of Science (BSc) in Biology from the Monmouth College, Master of Science (MSc) in Food Science and Technology and Doctor of Philosophy (PhD) in International Nutrition from the Cornell University.

Political career
Mohd Nasir had left Malaysian People's Party (Parti Rakyat Malaysia; PRM) and led a dissent group to form the new PSM in 1998 after the controversy of Malaysian People's Socialist Party (Parti Sosialis Rakyat Malaysia; PSRM)'s name reversion to PRM by the party's congress and the new leadership of Syed Husin Ali elected in 1989.

Operation Lalang
Mohd Nasir was arrested and detained without trial under the Internal Security Act 1960 (ISA) for 15 months at the Kamunting Detention Centre during Operation Lalang, a government-sponsored crackdown that saw the arrest of many people, including activists, intellectuals and opposition politicians in 1987.

Election results

Note: 1  2 3 Mohd Nasir Hashim amid contesting under the PKR ticket in the 2004, 2008 and 2013 elections, is a member of PSM.

External links 
 Biodata of Mohd Nasir Hashim PSM official website (PDF)

References 

Living people
1947 births
People from Malacca
Malaysian people of Malay descent
Malaysian Muslims
Members of the Selangor State Legislative Assembly
Leaders of political parties in Malaysia
Malaysian socialists
Malaysian political party founders
Monmouth College alumni
Parti Rakyat Malaysia politicians
Socialist Party of Malaysia politicians
Socialism in Malaysia